Glenrock (also spelled Glen Rock) is an unincorporated community in Nemaha County, Nebraska, United States.

History
A post office was established at Glenrock in 1859, and remained in operation until it was discontinued in 1929. The community was named on account of rock quarries nearby.

References

Unincorporated communities in Nemaha County, Nebraska
Unincorporated communities in Nebraska